IEBC may refer to:

 Independent Electoral and Boundaries Commission, a Kenyan regulatory agency
 (Irwin) Edward Bainbridge Cox, a British Barrister, magazine proprietor and politician